Ben Alexander may refer to:

Ben Alexander (actor) (1911–1969), American film actor
Ben Alexander (curler), English curler; see 2012 European Junior Curling Challenge
Ben Alexander (rugby league) (1971–1992), Australian rugby league player  
Ben Alexander (rugby union) (born 1984), Australian rugby union player
Benjamin F. Alexander, Alabama state representative
Benjamin Alexander (1737–1768), son of minister John Alexander, doctor of medicine and translator of Morgagni's De sedibus et causis morborum
Benjamin Alexander, winner of season 1 of Project Runway New Zealand
 Benjamin Alexander (skier), Jamaica's first Olympic alpine skier

See also
 Benjamin of Alexandria (disambiguation)